El Clásico Nacional ("National Classic") is a Honduran football match played between Olimpia and Marathón. The Classic began in September 1928 when Olimpia, at that time Central Zone champion, won its three match final series against Marathón, champion of the North.  This event created the fierce Clásico Nacional.

Head to head

The Finals
Olimpia and Marathón have played 9 finals. Six won by Olimpia and 3 won by Marathón.

1987-88 Honduran Liga Nacional

 Olimpia won 1–0 on aggregate.

2001-02 Clausura

 Marathón won 4-2 on aggregate.

References

Nac